John I. McMonagle (January 9, 1913 – May 20, 1992) was a former Democratic member of the Pennsylvania House of Representatives.

References

Democratic Party members of the Pennsylvania House of Representatives
1913 births
1992 deaths
Place of death missing
20th-century American politicians